The Monte Alegre State Park is a state park in the state of Pará, Brazil.
The park covers a hilly region to the north of the Amazon River. 
It is known for its caves and prehistoric rock paintings, among the oldest archaeological remains in the Amazon region.
Efforts have been made to get the local people involved in supporting sustainable tourism.

Location

The Monte Alegre State Park is in the municipality of Monte Alegre, Pará.
The park is entirely contained within the Paytuna Environmental Protection Area.
The park covers an area of mountains and valleys that contains caves with rock paintings and archaeological sites relevant to scientific studies of the occupation of the Amazon and the origin of humans in the Americas.
The sulphur-breasted parakeet (Aratinga maculata) is endemic to the region.

History

The park was the first conservation unit in Pará where the local community was involved in its creation.
It was the outcome of studies by the Pará Institute of Economic, Social and Environmental Development (IDESP) at the end of the 1980s.
The objective was to preserve the natural ecosystems, reconciling full protection of natural resources, cultural, historical and scenic beauties with use for scientific, cultural, educational, recreational and ecotourism purposes.
The members of the consultative council were named by ordinance 3717 of 29 December 2009.
The management plan was approved by decree 3.553 of 22 November 2010.

In November 2012 it was reported that researchers from the Museu Paraense Emílio Goeldi (MPEG) had recently found 19 sites in the lower part of the park with rock paintings and ceramic pieces. They were the work of ancient inhabitants of the region.
Law 7692 of 3 January 2013 rectified the limits of the park, transferring  to the Paytuna Environmental Protection Area.
In April 2013 the Peabiru Institute said that five initiatives had been chosen to help local women and young people provide ecotourism services.
The Monte Alegre Ecotourism Agents project would be supported by TAM Linhas Aéreas.

Attractions

The park is best known for the Serra da Lua, where rock paintings extend for over  along a wall in the Serra do Ererê.
The paintings have been widely reproduced on the internet, in postcards and in tourist brochures.
Most visitors only view the most accessible panel, with red and yellow figures that can be seen from the foot of the hill. 
It has several corridors and halls. 
This cave is in a region that was studied by the archaeologist Anna Curtenius Roosevelt and was widely publicized, so attracts the most tourists.

The Pedra do Mirante is a rock that may be climbed to reach a panoramic 360 degree view of the area.
The Painel do Pilão has cave paintings and a beautiful view of the region.
The Gruta do Pilão is a cave with paintings that is one of the oldest archaeological sites in the Amazon.
The Pedra do Pilão provides a lockout over the beautiful landscape.
It has a few rock paintings of low visual impact.

From there a passage leads to the exit hall.

Notes

Sources

Further reading

State parks of Brazil
Protected areas established in 2001
2001 establishments in Brazil
Protected areas of Pará